Pelton Pond is an  pond within Clarence Fahnestock State Park in northern Putnam County, in the U.S. state of New York.

According to an 1849 source it is named after a local miner.

References

Landforms of Putnam County, New York
Ponds of New York (state)